The 12th National Defence Commission (NDC) of North Korea was elected by the 1st Session of the 12th Supreme People's Assembly on 9 April 2009. It was replaced on 9 April 2014 by the 13th NDC.

Officers

Head Chairman

First Vice Chairman

Vice Chairman

Members

1st SPA Session (2009–11)

4th SPA Session (2011–12)

5th SPA Session (2012–14)

References

Citations

Bibliography
Books:
 

12th Supreme People's Assembly
National Defence Commission
2009 establishments in North Korea
2014 disestablishments in North Korea